Pure Phase is the second studio album by Spiritualized, released on 28 March 1995. The album was recorded in the Moles Studio in Bath, and features contributions from The Balanescu Quartet.  Initial CD copies were sold in a glow-in-the-dark, encapsulated CD case.

The lineup fluctuated during recording, with the band eventually reduced to a core trio of Jason Pierce, Kate Radley and Sean Cook. Previous members Mark Refoy and Jonny Mattock performed the main guitar and drums sections respectively, but by the time of album release, both men had been sacked from the band.  At the time of release, Pierce had renamed the band as "Spiritualized Electric Mainline", the name that appears on the album cover, before reverting to the Spiritualized name shortly afterwards.

The track "Pure Phase" was the basis for a limited edition release called "Pure Phase Tones For DJs", which consisted of 16 versions of "Pure Phase", four on each side of the single, playable at both 33 and 45rpm. The tracks were in the keys of C/F; D/G; E/A; F/B-flat; G/C; A/D; B/E; and C/F, at varying frequencies. Pierce intended that they were to be used as a set, in order to make chords. The 'Pure Phase Tone' still features heavily in Spiritualized's live set to this day, playing in between songs and before they go onstage, acting as their entrance music.

Music
The album's sound is described as space rock, noise pop, and Britpop.

Critical reception

In 2014, NME included the album in its list of "30 Glorious Britpop Albums That Deserve a Reissue Pronto."

Track listing
All songs by J. Pierce except "Born Never Asked" by Laurie Anderson

Personnel
 Jason Pierce – vocals, guitar (Gibson Firebird, Fender Thinline), dulcimer
 Kate Radley – keyboards (Vox Continental, Farfisa, piano), "tones, drones, tremeloes", backing vocals
 Sean Cook – bass (Fender Precision Bass), wha-monica
 Mark Refoy – guitar
 Jonny Mattock – drums
 Chris Sharrack – drums on "Lay Back in the Sun"
 Leon Hunt – banjo
 Simon Clarke – flute, saxophone
 Tim Sanders – saxophone
 The Balanescu Quartet – strings
 Claire Connors – string arrangement
 Roddy Lorimer, Stephen Sidwell – trumpet
 Stuart Gordon – violin
 Helen White, Marilyn McFarlane – vocals on "Let It Flow"
 Caroline Crawley – vocals on "The Slide Song"
 Produced by Jason Pierce
 Engineered by Mike Long, Andy Wilkinson, Julian Withers, Barry Clempson and Mads Bjerke
 Assistant engineers: Scott Powell and Richard Baker
 Mixed by Jason Pierce, John Coxon and Mads Bjerke
 Mastered by Chris Blair at Abbey Road Studios

References

1995 albums
Spiritualized albums
Noise pop albums